Speed of Life is the 23rd studio album from the Nitty Gritty Dirt Band, released by NGDB Records on September 22, 2009. It reached number 59 on the U.S. Country charts.

Track listing
"Tulsa Sounds Like Trouble to Me" (Shawn Camp, Mark D. Sanders) – 4:36
"Brand New Heartache" (Jeff Hanna, Donny Lowery) – 3:11
"The Resurrection" (Matraca Berg, Alice Randall) – 4:13
"Somethin' Dangerous" (Bob Carpenter, Tom Kell, Phil Soussan) – 3:25
"Going Up the Country" (Alan Wilson) – 4:15
"Jimmy Martin" (Phil Madeira, Jimmie Lee Sloas) – 3:35
"Lost in the Pines" (John McEuen) – 1:05
"Speed of Life" (Gary Scruggs) – 3:37
"Amazing Love" (Bob Carpenter, Jeff Hanna, Tom Kell) – 4:06
"Stuck in the Middle" (Joe Egan, Gerry Rafferty) – 3:42
"Earthquake" (Bob Carpenter, John McEuen) – 3:23
"Tryin' to Try" (Jimmie Fadden, Guy Clark) – 2:49
"Good To Be Alive" (Matraca Berg, Troy Verges) – 3:37

Personnel
Jeff Hanna – vocals, acoustic, electric and resonator guitars, slide guitar, mandolin
Jimmie Fadden – vocals, drums, harmonica, percussion
Bob Carpenter – vocals, Wurlitzer and grand pianos, accordion, Hammond organ
John McEuen – 5-string banjo, mandolin, fiddle, lap steel, finger-style acoustic guitar

Additional musicians
Jon Randall Stewart – acoustic guitar, mandolin, vocals
Glenn Worf – electric and upright bass
Richard Bennett – electric guitar, acoustic guitar, bouzouki, lap steel
Vince Santoro – percussion, drums
Matraca Berg – vocals
Jessi Alexander – vocals
Jaime Hanna – vocals

Production
Recorded live and mixed at: Blackbird Studio C, Nashville, TN.
Assisted by: Kazuri Arai and Nathan Yarborough
Produced and mixed by: George Massenburg and Jon Randall Stewart
Mastered by: Doug Sax and George Massenburg
Design: Gina Binkley/Alter Ego Design

Chart performance

References
All info is from album liner notes, unless otherwise noted.

Nitty Gritty Dirt Band albums
2009 albums
Albums produced by George Massenburg